PTDS may refer to:

 Polarimetric tornado debris signature
 Persistent Threat Detection System, a type of counter-IED equipment